The Rockford Aviators were a professional baseball team based in Rockford, Illinois that played in the independent Frontier League. Rockford previously had a team in the Frontier League called the RiverHawks (2002-2009). There was no Rockford team in the Frontier League in 2010 as the team played in the independent Northern League.  A separate RiverHawks franchise then returned to the Frontier League in 2011 and changed the team name to the Aviators in 2013. The RiverHawks began play at Marinelli Field.  In 2006, Rockford moved to RiverHawks Stadium, now known as Rivets Stadium, located in Loves Park, Illinois.

History
The Aviators Frontier League franchise was relocated from Springfield, Illinois, where the franchise played as the Springfield Capitals.  The team moved to Rockford for the 2002 season.  The RiverHawks franchise moved to the Northern League in 2010, but stayed for one season before a Rockford team returned to the Frontier League in 2011 when the Northern League folded.  The team changed the name to the Aviators for 2013.  The Aviators folded following the 2015 season.

The highlight for Rockford was the stellar 2004 Frontier League season with manager Bob Koopmann, winning the West division with a 59-37 (.615) record, advancing to the playoffs where they edged the Windy City Thunderbolts 3-2 in the best of five series to advance to the league championship series.  Rockford would then sweep the Evansville Otters 3-0 to win the Frontier League title.  The team was led by pitcher Josh Tomsu (10-3, 2.64 ERA), closer Josh Latimer (3-3, 15 saves, 2.47 ERA), Aaron McEachran (.332 BA, 11 HR, 62 RBI), Rico Santana (.284 BA, 5 HR, 65 RBI, 27 SB), Doug Schutt (.286 BA, 3 HR, 32 RBI, 39 SB) and Frontier League MVP Rich Austin (.359 BA, 15 HR, 77 RBI, 22 SB).

The franchise hit instability in 2012 when the RiverHawks ballpark went through foreclosure.  The stadium ultimately was sold through auction in 2015.  The league had taken over management of the Aviators franchise late in the 2015 season, and with financial instability, the team disbanded.

Rockford is represented in the Frontier League Hall of Fame by outfielders Stephen Holdren, Jason James and Richard Austin.

Seasons

Notable alumni
Drew Rucinski (2011–13)
José Martínez (2014)
Josh Smoker (2014)
Nick Anderson (2012–13)

References

External links
 Frontier League
 Aviators page at OurSports Central

Frontier League teams
Professional baseball teams in Illinois
Defunct Frontier League teams
Defunct baseball teams in Illinois
Aviators
Baseball teams established in 2013
Baseball teams disestablished in 2015
Defunct independent baseball league teams
2013 establishments in Illinois
Baseball teams established in 2002